Atotonilco El Grande is a town and one of the 84 municipalities of Hidalgo, in central-eastern Mexico. The municipal seat lies at Atotonilco El Grande (municipality).  The municipality covers an area of  426.6 km².

As of 2005, the municipality had a total population of 23,823.

References

Municipalities of Hidalgo (state)
Populated places in Hidalgo (state)